Free FireWire Audio Drivers (FFADO) is a project to provide open-source drivers for FireWire sound interfaces on Linux. The project began as FreeBoB, a driver specifically for FireWire audio devices based on technology made by BridgeCo, which use an interface named BeBoB The current version allows such devices to be accessed via the JACK Audio Connection Kit (JACK).

Following a presentation of a paper at the 2007 Linux Audio Conference outlining the future of the project, on March 26, 2007, it was announced that the project would be renamed to FFADO, as the drivers are being rewritten to include support for other FireWire audio chipsets.

References

External links

Linux drivers